Cyclophora lautokensis is a moth in the  family Geometridae. It is found on Fiji.

References

Moths described in 1929
Cyclophora (moth)
Moths of Fiji